Working Girls is a 1931 American pre-Code drama film directed by Dorothy Arzner and written by Zoë Akins, based on the play Blind Mice, written by Vera Caspary and Winifred Lenihan. The film stars Judith Wood, Charles "Buddy" Rogers, Paul Lukas, Stuart Erwin, and Frances Dee. The film was released on December 12, 1931, by Paramount Pictures.

Plot
Two sisters from Indiana, Mae and June Thorpe, move into a house for homeless girls in New York. With June's help, Mae obtains a job as a stenographer for scientist Joseph von Schraeder, while June gets work as a telegraph operator. June begins dating Pat Kelly, a saxophone player who lavishes her with gifts. Mae begins to date Boyd Wheeler, a successful lawyer. Mae turns down a marriage proposal from von Schraeder, and von Shraeder asks that she then quit her job so he will not be hurt by having her around. Mae compromises her virtue with Boyd by staying alone with him one night in his apartment. She suffers for her choice when he goes out of town for a month and returns engaged to a socialite.

Now, June derides Mae for trusting someone from a higher class. As her sister has been out of work for months, June goes to von Schraeder, who kindly offers to rehire Mae. He realizes, however, that he is really in love with June. After her first week back at work, Mae asks von Schraeder to renew his proposal, as she is pregnant. He does so graciously, but on the eve of her engagement party, Boyd returns, his engagement having been broken. June is aware that Boyd is already responsible for one broken engagement and prevents Mae from seeing him again. June changes her mind, realizing her sister has a chance for happiness, and borrows Kelly's gun. Kelly, Mae, and June go to Boyd's apartment, where June forces Boyd at gunpoint to agree to marry Mae. He happily complies. Later, June and Kelly run into von Schraeder at a Chinese restaurant, and after sending Kelly away, June tells von Schraeder the news. He is not disappointed, revealing he is in love with her, which she reciprocates.

Cast
Judith Wood as June Thorpe
Dorothy Hall as Mae Thorpe
Charles "Buddy" Rogers as Boyd Wheeler
Paul Lukas as Dr. Joseph Von Schrader
Stuart Erwin as Pat Kelly
Frances Dee as Louise Adams
Mary Forbes as Mrs. Johnstone
Claire Dodd as Jane
Dorothy Stickney as Loretta
Alberta Vaughn as Violet
 Claude King as Mr. Adams

Legacy
Arzner later described the film (described later as a feminist work) as one of her favorites, but the movie did not receive much attention on a limited release. The film toiled in obscurity without a home video release from its rightsholder (which was Universal Pictures after the studio bought a number of Paramount's old library). Prints exist of the film, which included a screening at UCLA in 2015 alongside bootleg prints. For a time, the film was available on The Criterion Channel.

References

External links
 

1931 films
1930s English-language films
American drama films
1931 drama films
Paramount Pictures films
Films directed by Dorothy Arzner
Films set in New York City
American black-and-white films
Films based on works by Vera Caspary
1930s American films